Bonnelly is a surname and may refer to:

Idelisa Bonnelly (born 1931)
Rafael Filiberto Bonnelly (1904–1979), lawyer, scholar and president of Dominican Republic
Sully Bonnelly (born 1956), Dominican fashion designer

See also
 Bonnell (disambiguation)